Now United (sometimes abbreviated as NU) is a global pop group, formed in Los Angeles in 2017 by Idols creator Simon Fuller. Originally, the group was consisted of 14 members from 14 countries. The group currently has 6 active members, 13 have either left or inactive with activities. Each member represents a different country with the possibility of adding new members from a different country and also a possibility of passing the representation to a new generation of members.

History

2017: Pre-debut, announcement, and "Summer in the City"
In mid-2016, Idols creator and Spice Girls manager Simon Fuller began searching for talent to fulfill his plan of creating a global pop group with members from all over the world. The selection took place through social media as well as dance schools and music academies, using expert choreographers, vocal coaches, and songwriters.

In September 2017, Fuller indicated that "to recruit the 14 youngsters in Now United, he employed 20 people to travel the world for 18 months, holding auditions with groups of 10 to 20 people at a time". But after seeing the talents of various youngsters he decided to make a group of 14 members of different nationalities, with future possible members. From 11 to 22 November 2017, each of the members was revealed. On 13 November, the first teaser of the complete group was released, in the song "Boom Boom" by the record producer and record executive RedOne.

On 5 December 2017, Now United released their first single "Summer in the City", on Al Gore's "24 Hours of Reality", a global broadcast intended to work to raise awareness around the global climate crisis.

2018: Debut, Promo World Tour and Pepsi
In April 2018, the group began its Promo World Tour, where they appeared on many TV shows across the world. The tour began in Moscow, making their first public appearance on television performing "Summer in the City" on the finale of the Russian version of The Voice Kids.

On 30 May, Now United was featured in the single "One World" with RedOne and Adelina.

On 5 July, Now United debuted in the United States on The Late Late Show with James Corden performing "Summer in the City". In less than three months, the group released the official videos of three singles, on 24 July, "What Are We Waiting For", shot in South Korea; on 28 September, "Who Would Think That Love?" shot in Mexico; and on 6 November, "All Day", shot in California. During their Indian tour, Now United shot "How We Do It", released on December 15, which featured Indian rapper Badshah. On 29 December, Dreams Come True: The Documentary was released, showcasing the creation process of the group.

2019: Special Olympics and Dreams Come True Tour
On 29 January 2019, "Beautiful Life", which was also shot in India, was also released.

During the Philippines tour, Now United shot and released "Afraid of Letting Go" on 17 March. On 28 April, "Sundin Ang Puso", which was also shot in the Philippines was released. The group also participated in the Opening Ceremony of the 2019 Special Olympics World Summer Games in Abu Dhabi. On 7 June, "Paraná", was released. By mid-2019, it was announced that two new members would be added to Now United. The selection took place through social media and fan voting. On 25 July, Now United released "Sunday Morning". On 11 August, "Crazy Stupid Silly Love" was released. The month after, "Like That" was released on 8 September. On 20 September, "You Give Me Something" was released. The song is a bilingual cover of the song by James Morrison and is performed in English and Portuguese by members Lamar Morris and Any Gabrielly. In October, it was officially announced that the search for a new member from the Middle East or North Africa had commenced. They also shot their music video called "Legends" while on tour, which was released on 14 November. During November 2019, the group embarked on their "Dreams Come True Tour" in Brazil. On 15 December, "Na Na Na", which has main vocals from Sabina, which was filmed at the Municipal Theatre in Rio de Janeiro was released. "Let Me Be the One" was released on the 28th.

2020: Quarantine, Destination UAE and New Members
On February 11, the group introduced its 15th member, Savannah Clarke from Australia. On February 12, "Live This Moment" was released being the first single of the year. On March 7, the single "Come Together" featured Savannah Clarke for the first time. The group was set to embark on their "Come Together" Tour between May and June, which was postponed on March 20, due to COVID-19 concerns.

On April 3, the third single of the year, "Wake Up," was released. A few days later, "By My Side" was released, which was filmed by members in their homes. Their single "Better" was released on the 30th, and a lyrics video for Better was released on June 30.

On May 8, the single "Dana Dana" was released, which was filmed remotely amid the coronavirus pandemic, the song had been teased for several months and included Shivani Paliwal's rap in Hindi. "Stand Together" was released on June 23 of the same year.

On August 8, "Nobody Fools Me Twice" was released, in the Korean language. On August 18, "Feel It Now" was released. On September 2, the Spanish version of the single "Na Na Na" was released as "Na Na Na - Spanish Version". On September 5, Diarra Sylla announced her departure from the group during an interview with The Hollywood Fix. On September 14, members Heyoon and Josh announced on YouTube that the search for the 16th member would officially begin The single/music video for "The Weekend's Here" was filmed in Dubai with Sofya, Savannah, Sina, and Heyoon. On September 21, Simon Fuller, the group's manager, announced the 16th member, Nour Ardakani from Lebanon. On the 30th, the last single of the month was released, called "Somebody" with the first line from Sina Deinert.

On October 7, "Chained Up" was released, which had been in the works for some time, same as "Live This Moment", the song/music video features the group's boys, but with the addition of Heyoon. On October 10, the single "Paradise" debuted, but this music was only later released as a music video. The music video/single "Habibi" was released on October 19, it was the first music video featuring Nour Ardakani, who served as the center. On November 7, another single, "One Love", was released. "Pas Le Choix (Manal Mix)" was the group's new single for the first time. On December 10, this single was officially released, featuring the girls of the group. This marked the debut of Joalin and Hina in singing, Diarra's return due to a contract still valid from the time she was in the group, and Melanie Thomas' first music video appearance. On December 30, the last single of the year, "Hewale", starring former-member Diarra, and Mélanie, was released.

2021: Now Love, New Member and Love, Love, Love: A Musical
The group released its first song of the year, "How Far We've Come" on January 8, 2021. The next single, which debuted on January 15, was titled "Lean On Me". "Lean On Me" was shot by choreographer Nicki Andersen and was set in Emirates Place in Abu Dhabi, UAE. "All Around The World" debuted on January 29. The video was filmed by each of the members in their native countries.

The first clip, released in March for the single "Paradise" and is called "Paradise - Official Memories Video," debuted on March 9. Later on March 16 the music video for "Turn It Up" was released, as a part of a partnership with KitKat.

On April 10, the single "Fiesta" was released, which was filmed in Mexico, in the hotel garden of Cancun where the members were stranded. Then "Baila" was released. When they finished filming in San Luis Obispo, they left the farm on April 5 to shoot. A few days later, on April 9, the boys traveled from Los Angeles to Malibu. After a few days of filming, they traveled to Hawaii on April 13, where they shot a few music videos. On April 25, it was revealed that the 18th member is Spanish. On April 28, the identity of the new member was disclosed, 15 year-old Mallorca native Alex Mandon Rey.

"Let the Music Move You", which was filmed in Hawaii was released on May 1. The next release was on May 8, when the music video for the single "Show You How To Love" was released in Malibu, the single had been previously released solely as audio. Over-the-record lyric videos were released the same month, with "Baila" released on May 15, "Stand Together" on May 17, and "Come Together" on May 26. As a part of a Partnership with Forever 21, they released "Nobody Like Us", which was filmed in Hawaii.

On June 1, the group announced that it would hold an online concert, the "Now Love Live Show". The music video released of their "NU Party" was released on the 18th, this featured member Lamar who was on Hiatus. On June 28, the group announced that it would host its first virtual camp, known as "Camp Now United 2021". The "Now Love Live Show" was filmed at Louvre Abu Dhabi and streamed exclusively through YouTube Premium on July 1, the online concert marked the group's first major concert since 2019 and the debut concert for Nour, Savannah, Melanie and Alex.

"Camp Now United 2021" began filming on July 5, 2021, in Brazil. The music video of "Wave Your Flag" was officially released on the 14th. Filmed at Louvre Abu Dhabi, it marked the debut of Alex Mandon Rey. On July 15, the launch of the Camp Now United competition was announced, with 12 winners being selected for a trip to Abu Dhabi. Now United's music appeared at the Tokyo 2020 Olympics, with several songs being played at competitions. A lyrics video for "Wave Your Flag" was released on the 30th.

On August 15, the group announced their first musical, "Love, Love, Love", would be coming soon; it was filmed during their Bootcamp in San Luis Obispo in March–April 2021. A trailer was released the next day on the group's YouTube channel. "Love, Love, Love" was released on August 28, alongside "When You Love Somebody", "Dance Like That" and "Momento" on the group's YouTube Channel. Bailey May described the experience of filming a musical stating that it was not challenging as he was playing his own character.

It was announced on September 6, that the group would be traveling to Abu Dhabi for their Bootcamp. On September 10, all three of the "Love, Love, Love" songs ("When You Love Somebody", "Dance Like That" and "Momento") were released on all music platforms. "Ikou" Music video, which was filmed in Mexico, was released on the 11th. Following their Bootcamp, it was revealed that they would be traveling to Portugal. The official Music video for "Dance Like That" was released on the 16th. It was announced on the 27th, that the group would be partnering with SheinX Rock the Runway online fashion show.

On October 3, the group performed "Wave Your Flag" at the 25th Globos de Ouro awards ceremony. A new edition of "Come together" was released on the 4th, alongside the 12 camp winners. The Bootcampers released their first song, "Good Days" on the 7th. The group released two more music videos, "I Got You" and "Anything for You" were released on the 22nd. Another song, "Future Me" which was filmed in Abu Dhabi was released on the 30th. "I Got You" and "Anything For You" was released across all streaming platforms on November 11. It was announced that the group would be returning to Brazil. Any Gabrielly leaked information during an interview that the group would be touring in 2022. "Future Me" was released across streaming platforms on the 18th. It was officially announced on November 21, that the group would be embarking on their "Wave Your Flag World Tour" with dates announced in Brazil and Portugal, members reassured fans that future dates would be later announced.

Information surrounding the filming of the "Jump" music video was leaked on December 5. The group performed "All Day", "Future Me" and "Wave Your Flag" on an aired broadcast of Domingao com Huck on the 12th. Due to high demand, 3 new dates were announced on December 17 in Brazil. The official music video for "Badna Nehlam" was released on the 22nd. The group announced on December 29, that they will release an upcoming song featuring Alta B. On December 30, their single "Jump" was released, featuring Alta B and R3HAB as producers, the music video was made in partnership with Verizon. Jump reached a milestone of 50 million views in the span of 3 weeks.

2022: Wave Your Flag World Tour, Forever United, New-Old Members
On January 6, the group announced the launch of the #badnanehlamchallenge online dance challenge, with two winners being selected to meet with the group, winners were announced on February 6. On January 24, R3HAB's CYB3RPVNK radio station first heard the band's soon-to-be debut latest single "Heartbreak On The Dance Floor".On January 28, members of the group began traveling to Dubai and Los Angeles. On February 14, The group as a whole began their first Bootcamp of 2022 in preparation for the "Wave Your Flag World Tour".

Sabina Hidalgo announced her pregnancy on February 24, Hidalgo reassured fans that she would continue performing but would refrain from certain songs.

"Heartbreak On The Dance Floor" was officially released on March 4. On March 11, the group launched the Wave Your Flag Tour at Porto Alegre, Brazil with two shows. The group performed their new single "All Night Long" with Melanie serving as the main vocals. The group also performed "Jump", "Golden", "Heartbreak On The Dance Floor" and "Future Me" for the first time. The tour also shows the music video for "It's Your Birthday" before they released it on YouTube on Shivani's birthday. On March 13 the group flew to Curitiba, Brazil to perform their tour for two days. On March 16, the group flew to Any's hometown, São Paulo, Brazil to perform their tour for three days. On March 17, the group released the lyric video for "Dana Dana" to celebrate Holi, the video was shot during their 2020 Bootcamp before the pandemic. On March 27, the group performed in Recife, the group's last performance in Brazil as part of the tour. On March 28, the group left Brazil and traveled to Portugal to begin preparations for the tour's performances there.

On April 1, the group performed its first concert in Portugal in Lisbon, this marked the first time the group performed with 15 members with the addition of Joalin. On April 3, the group performed on the talent show Got Talent Portugal. After the concerts in Lisbon and Porto in Portugal, Melanie and Bailey traveled to the Ivory Coast to shoot a secret music video there, while the others traveled back home for a break, and some members traveled to the United States and Brazil for some reasons.

After a break, the group released a music video for the single "Heartbreak On The Dancefloor" on May 20, which was released by Vevo. On June 14, it was announced that the group will start shooting a new musical. In June, the group released dance videos with members of The Future X, choreographed by Nicky Andersen. Pre-production of the already confirmed musical began and members of the LA began rehearsals. The group confirmed that the musical will begin filming in the UK in August. Zane Carter was a member of boot campers introduced last year.

On July 6, VEVO, a post on its Instagram page summing up the Top 10 music video of the year, reached number 6 on this list with the group's single "Jump". On July 27, the group's logo changed across all their social media platforms, resulting in TikTok, Instagram, and Twitter as well. On August 5, 2022, Sabina announced she had given birth to a healthy baby boy named Enzo, who was born on August 4. She departed from Now United to take care of her son and all the maternity things. On August 8, they announced that their newest single "Like Me" would soon debut, the song was remixed by Eric Kupper. On August 10, the single "Like Me" was released on the PRO MOTION website in a 5-minute version and a radio edit which is 3 minutes long. PRO MOTION also served as a producer on the single and music video. On August 16, a dance video version of the group's newest single "Like Me" was released on their YouTube channel. On August 17, filming/work began for the upcoming musical. On August 19, the official music video for the single "Like Me" was released. The music video does not feature the version remixed by Eric Kupper.

On September 22, the group announced that they would be touring in November, the tour has 1 Brazilian (São Paulo) and 2 Portuguese (Lisbon, Braga) stops. The tour starts as Forever United. 2 days after the tour was announced, Any Gabrielly announced that she was going to start her solo career, therefore announcing her departure from the group. She revealed that Simon Fuller will continue to be her manager and that he will help in the search for a new Brazilian member. On October 18, Noah Urrea announced via his Instagram profile that he was going to start his solo career, effectively announcing his departure from Now United, and Zane Carter, one of the 12 winners of the Now United Bootcampers in Abu Dhabi would replace him in representing the USA. On October 19, the group announced that the search for the 19th member from Portugal officially started. At the end of October, the group spent 4 days in Saud-Arabia. During this time, they filmed a music video for one of their singles in which R3HAB will once again be a co-performer. On October 31, Now United released the music video for Mélanie's highlight song "All Night Long". The music video served as a memory of their previous tour and as an invitation to the Forever United Tour. It also had scenes shot in the studio with Mélanie and Any.

On November 10, Josh Beauchamp announced through Instagram that he was going to start his solo career, also announcing his departure from the group. On November 14, the group released the music video for Noah's solo "Good Intentions" which looked at the past 5 years Noah spent with the group. On November 15, the trailer for the group's newest musical was officially released, with the performance being The Musical: Welcome to the Night of Your Lives named. On November 16, the casting of the new Brazilian member was held at the Rexona Dance Studio in São Paulo. On November 19, the group announced on its TikTok page the 4 finalists among whom it will be decided who will represent Brazil. On November 19, the Forever United Tour kicked off, with the group performing in São Paulo as the first stop. During their time in Brazil, the group was invited to the TV Show The Noite com Danilo Gentili where, in addition to the "interview", they performed with the singles "All Night Long" and "Clockwork". They also gave interviews to the Brazilian MTV Hits, which was released on the Brazilian MTV YouTube channel. On 25 and 27 November, the Forever United Tour continued in Portugal, including Lisbon and then in Braga. The concerts in Portugal differed in stage appearance from those in Brazil, where various stage elements such as fire and confetti were used. In Portugal, they gave an interview to the SIC channel and performed with "All Night Long" for one of the charity shows.

On December 1, the group's single "Clockwork" was released, which was first heard on the Brazilian TV show The Noite. Any Gabrielly posted on her Twitter page that this "Clockwork" is her last song with Now United. On December 19, a cover of "True Love Ways" was released, sung by Zane. The music video was filmed in Portugal. On December 20, the group notified fans in an email that the year 2023 would be the beginning of a new era. Along with that, they announced that their latest single, "Holiday," would be released on December 26. On the same day, the group made history and "entered" the Guinness World Records under the name Most Nationalities In A Pop Group. On December 26, the group's newest single, "Holiday", was released. With that said, in the words of the group, a new era is beginning that holds many surprises for the future.

2023: New Era, New Members 
On January 9, some members of the group Mélanie Thomas, Savannah Clarke, Nour Ardakani, Lamar Morris, Alex Mandon Rey, Zane Carter announced that they would be moving to Los Angeles and living with the other members here. On January 13, Bailey May announced that he would leave the group after 5 years and embark on a solo career. Bailey also revealed that he will help find the perfect successor who will represent the Philippines in the future. On January 14, the group's new single "Odo" was released, sung by Bailey and Mélanie. The music video was filmed in 2022 after the Wave Your Flag World Tour in Côte d'Ivoire. One of the major innovations on social media platforms, especially YouTube, was the completion of The Now United Show, which was published once a week for 5 years. On January 15, a new-style weekly series called This Week With Now United began. 

On February 8, former member,Any Gabrielly announced a video on the group's social media platforms that 8 unreleased songs would soon be released due to the celebration of "OG Members". The eight songs are "Love is Love", "Cotton Candy", "Dabke", "Love Myself", "U & Me", "Find Your Fire", "It's Gonna Be Alright", "Throwback". On February 9, a music video for "It's Gonna Be Alright" was released as a surprise on the group's YouTube channel. The music video contains memories of 2021's Camp Now United spent in Brazil. On February 14, the next unreleased single "Love is Love" was released. The music video consists of Love, Love, Love. A Musical and its filming scenes. On February 15, the group released the next previously unreleased song, "Cotton Candy," a song sung by some of the boy members of the group. The accompanying music video consists of the group's memories of Hawaii that happened back in 2021. On February 16, Sina Deinert announced a video posted on the group's Instagram page that she would be away from the group this year and would focus on her own projects, but would not leave the group. On the same day, two members of the group, Savannah Clarke and Zane Carter, announced on Twitter that the group's newest musical, The Musical: Welcome to the Night of Your Lives, would be released on March 22 on plataform OP3N. On February 17, the singles "It's Gonna Be Alright", "Love Is Love", "Cotton Candy" and "Throwback" were released on all music streaming platforms. On February 18, a music video for the single "Find Your Fire" was released on the group's YouTube channel. The clip contains extra footage from the Forever United Tour of members in action and fans. On February 21, the single "Find Your Fire" was released on all music streaming platforms. On February 23, the next single "U & Me" was released on all music streaming platforms. On February 23, the music video for the single "Throwback" was released. On February 25, the next single "Love Myself" was released on all music streaming platforms. On February 27, the music video for the single "Love Myself" was released. In a video on the group's YouTube channel, Sofya announced that she would be working on new projects and quoting her. On February 28, the next and last unreleased single "Dabke" was released.

On March 1, the music video for the single "U & Me" was released. Also on the same day is when Hina Yoshihara and Heyoon Jeong announced that they would be leaving the group to pursue a solo career. On March 3, the group's new single was released on all music streaming platforms, "Rodeo in Tokyo". This song is Hina's "farewell song" to the group before she embarks on a solo career. On March 4, Shivani Paliwal announced that she would be leaving the group too. Also on the same day the group's first song from The Musical: Welcome to the Night of Your Lives was released on YouTube, the song called "I Am".  And also on the same day, "Dabke" music video was released on YouTube. On March 8, Joalin Loukamaa officially announced on her Instagram that she was no longer a member of the group. On March 9, the musical's masquerade single "Welcome to the Night of Your Life" was released on the OP3N platform. On March 10, the music video for the single "Run Till Dark" was released, at the same time the music was released on all music streaming platforms. The single is co-performed by R3HAB with whom this is the group's third song together. On March 15th, The Musical: Welcome to the Night of Your Lives soundtrack was released exclusively on OP3N.

Public image and reception
Now United has been perceived as a response from North American music managers in reaction to the rising global popularity of K-pop. Much of Now United's popularity is based in Latin America, where most of its streams and views come from. In a more critical article, BBC music correspondent, Mark Savage stated that the group have not yet troubled the charts and do not have the impact that Fuller's other clients have had.

In addition to singing, the group is known to perform elaborate and synchronized choreography. Fan interaction between the members and their fanbase has been seen as a factor behind their success, with the content being produced and released on a daily basis. The Group has since gained over 130 million followers across online platforms and over 2.7 billion views on their YouTube Channel.

Other ventures

Endorsements
Now United's status as one of Brazil's most popular music acts, their large fanbase, and social media following have made them attractive to large corporate brands including Pepsi, Forever 21, and KitKat. Now United is the official dance partner of Rexona Brazil, they have filmed several commercials for the brand and have released limited edition products. The group signed with Brazilian licensing agency, Redibra in 2021 which aims to offer exclusive products in the Brazilian market. In January 2019, the group signed a global sponsorship deal with Pepsi. In April 2021, the group teamed up with KitKat to launch a special edition KitKat Bar, which was sold exclusively in Brazil. Since December 2021, the group have partnered with record label VEVO for the promotion of their music videos.

Members

 Additional Notes
 Lamar was inactive for a long time after their debut. He returned to the group on the release of "You Give Me Something".
 Joalin left before the "Dreams Come True Tour" for an unknown reason. She returned to the group to film multiple music videos during the 2020 Pandemic. She also returned to the group during their travel to Dubai in 2020. She returned again to perform in "Wave Your Flag Tour" in Portugal. She is currently pursuing her solo career.
 Diarra revealed she left the group during an interview with Hollywood Fix on September 2020. She returned in the recording of the Music Videos for "Pas Le Choix", "All Around the World" and "Hewale".
 Krystian left the group during the 2020 Pandemic. He participated in the recording of "Feel It Now" and "Chained Up" but never returned after that and pursue his solo career after joining Youth With You (Season 3) and Boys Planet from South Korea.
 Bailey was inactive after the "Wave Your Flag Tour". He left the group in January of 2023.
 Left after "Forever Now United Tour" to pursue a solo career.
 Sabina is inactive after giving birth to her son, Enzo. She returned to perform in "Forever Now United Tour" and after that, she will leave the group for some time and take care of her family.
 Zane participated in the Abu Dhabi Bootcamp 2021. He also participated in "The Musical: Welcome To The Night Of Your Lives!". He will be taking over for Noah Urrea in representing the United States of America.
 The new member will be taking over for Any Gabrielly in representing Brazil.
 The new member will be taking over for Bailey May in representing the Philippines.
 Sina announced she would be away from the group in 2023 and would focus on her own projects, but would not leave the group.
 Sofya announced she's moving onto some new projects
 Hina, Heyoon, and Shivani announced that they left the group and will be pursuing their solo career.

Timeline

Discography

Soundtrack albums
 The Musical (2023)

Filmography

Films

Online shows

Events

Awards and nominations

References

External links
 

 
Vocal ensembles
American pop music groups
Musical groups established in 2017
Musical groups from Los Angeles
XIX Entertainment artists
2017 establishments in California